The 2018 Jacksonville State Gamecocks football team represented Jacksonville State University as a member of the Ohio Valley Conference (OVC) during the 2018 NCAA Division I FCS football season. Led by fifth-year head coach John Grass, the Gamecocks compiled an overall record of 9–4, with a mark of 7–1 conference play, winning the OVC title for the fifth consecutive season. Jacksonville State received the OVC's automatic bid to the NCAA Division I Football Championship playoff marking the program's sixth straight trip to the FCS playoffs. The Gamecocks defeated East Tennessee State in the first round before losing to Maine in the second round. The team played home games at Burgess–Snow Field at JSU Stadium in Jacksonville, Alabama.

Previous season
The Gamecocks finished the 2017 season 10–2, 8–0 in OVC play to win the conference championship for the fourth consecutive year. The Gamecocks received the OVC's automatic bid to the FCS Playoffs as the No. 3 overall seed, marking their fifth straight trip to the FCS playoffs. After a bye, they were upset by Kennesaw State in the second round.

On October 14, the Gamecocks won their 27th straight OVC conference game, setting the conference record for consecutive games won.

Preseason

OVC media poll
On July 20, 2018, the media covering the OVC released their preseason poll with the Gamecocks predicted to win the OVC championship. On July 23, the OVC released their coaches poll with the Gamecocks also predicted to become OVC champions.

Preseason All-OVC team
The Gamecocks had six players selected to the preseason all-OVC team. Defensive lineman Randy Roberinson was also selected as the preseason defensive player of the year.

Offense

Tyler Scozzaro – C

B.J. Autry– G

Darius Anderson – G

Defense

Randy Robinson – DL

Marlon Bridges – DB

Specialists

Cade Stinnett – K

Award watch lists

Schedule

Game summaries

vs North Carolina A&T

Mississippi Valley State

Tennessee Tech

Austin Peay

at Eastern Kentucky

Eastern Illinois

at Southeast Missouri State

at Murray State

UT Martin

at Tennessee State

vs Kennesaw State

East Tennessee State—NCAA Division I First Round

at Maine—NCAA Division I Second Round

Ranking movements

References

Jacksonville State
Jacksonville State Gamecocks football seasons
Ohio Valley Conference football champion seasons
Jacksonville State
Jacksonville State Gamecocks football